Thomas Agyiri (born 28 April 1994) is a Ghanaian professional footballer who plays as a midfielder for KTP.

Career

Agyiri began his football career at the Right to Dream Academy in Ghana before signing for Manchester City in 2012, one of a growing number of Ghanaians who joined the English club from the academy since a partnership began between them in 2010. Upon signing with them he was rapidly sent to Portugal on loan with Manchester City feeder club Gil Vicente.

Agyiri's made his professional debut after he was loaned in the following year to Veikkausliiga side TPS Turku. On the 25 August 2013 he was placed in the starting line-up for his first ever senior match, a league game against RoPS, playing all 90 minutes but also receiving his first booking in a 1–1 draw.

In July 2015, Agyiri signed a one-year deal with S.C. Farense.

Career statistics

References

External links
 
 

1994 births
Living people
Ghanaian footballers
Ghanaian expatriate footballers
Veikkausliiga players
Ykkönen players
Liga Portugal 2 players
Manchester City F.C. players
Gil Vicente F.C. players
Turun Palloseura footballers
Right to Dream Academy players
S.C. Farense players
FC Ilves players
C.D. Fátima players
Kotkan Työväen Palloilijat players
Atlético Clube de Portugal players
Expatriate footballers in England
Expatriate footballers in Portugal
Expatriate footballers in Finland
Ghanaian expatriate sportspeople in Portugal
Ghanaian expatriate sportspeople in England
Ghanaian expatriate sportspeople in Finland
Association football midfielders